Monte Grosso is a mountain in Haute-Corse, Corsica, France, with an elevation of . It belongs to the Monte Cinto massif.

External links
 

Mountains of Haute-Corse
Grosso
Corsica region articles needing translation from French Wikipedia